Springville is a village in the southeastern section of the town of Concord in Erie County, New York,  United States. Springville is the principal community in the town and a major business location in southern Erie County. The population was 4,296 at the 2010 census. It is part of the Buffalo–Niagara Falls Metropolitan Statistical Area. Springville was originally named "Fiddler's Green" before it was renamed "Springville". Springville is well known for being home to Glenn “Pop” Warner, an important figure in American Football history. It is governed by current mayor Timothy Michaels as of 2022, and the village Board of Trustees.

History
In 1808, Samuel Cochran became the first permanent settler in the town, it had been a tract of land once known as Holland Purchase. The Springville Academy, opening in 1830, became the first high school in Erie County. It was given its current name, Springville Griffith Institute, in 1867 to honor Archibald Griffith, a donor. The village of Springville was incorporated in 1834 from part of the town of Concord. The Dygert Farm on Elk Street was the site of the 1866 and 1867 Erie County Fair, and also served as training grounds for Jim Thorpe.

The Springville post office contains a mural, Fiddler's Green, painted in 1939 by Victoria Hutson Huntley. Federally commissioned murals were produced from 1934 to 1943 in the United States through the Section of Painting and Sculpture, later called the Section of Fine Arts, of the Treasury Department.

Springville is home to five National Register of Historic Places-listed (NRHP) buildings (Citizens National Bank; Buffalo, Rochester and Pittsburgh Railroad Station; Baptist Church of Springville; United States Post Office; Scoby Power Plant and Dam) and the NRHP-listed East Main-Mechanic Streets Historic District and East Hill Historic District.

Geography

Cattaraugus Creek and Cattaraugus County are south of the village.

New York State Route 39 (NY 39), a major east–west truck road, becomes Main Street upon entering Springville. U.S. Route 219, the Southern Expressway, passes just west of the village. NY 240 (Vaughn Street), a major north–south truck road, marks the east border of the village.

Demographics

As of the census of 2000, there were 4,252 people, 1,705 households, and 1,091 families residing in the village. The population density was 1,164.4 people per square mile (449.8/km2). There were 1,798 housing units at an average density of 492.4 per square mile (190.2/km2). The racial makeup of the village was 98.28% White, 0.49% African American, 0.21% Native American, 0.40% Asian, 0.02% Pacific Islander, 0.19% from other races, and 0.40% from two or more races. Hispanic or Latino of any race were 0.61% of the population.

There were 1,705 households, out of which 31.4% had children under the age of 18 living with them, 49.3% were married couples living together, 10.3% had a female householder with no husband present, and 36.0% were non-families. 31.5% of all households were made up of individuals, and 16.3% had someone living alone who was 65 years of age or older. The average household size was 2.40 and the average family size was 3.01.

The population was spread out in the village with 25.1% under the age of 18, 7.1% from 18 to 24, 26.9% from 25 to 44, 21.8% from 45 to 64, and 19.1% who were 65 years of age or older. The median age was 40 years. For every 100 females, there were 85.8 males. For every 100 females age 18 and over, there were 82.1 males.

The median income for a household in the village was $38,221, and the median income for a family was $49,422. Males had a median income of $39,452 versus $24,621 for females. The per capita income for the village was $19,302. About 5.4% of families and 7.4% of the population were below the poverty line, including 11.0% of those under age 18 and 3.5% of those age 65 or over.

Notable people

 Joseph Gallup Cochran (1817–1871), Presbyterian missionary, minister, teacher, and translator.
 C. DeForest Cummings, former Syracuse Orange football coach
 Emmons Dunbar, agriculturalist, college football coach
 Erwin F. Dygert, noted importer of Belgian horses, and harness racing
 Elon Howard Eaton, ornithologist, attended school in Springville
 Ken Knowlton, computer graphics pioneer
 Asher P. Nichols, state senator
 Fletcher Pratt, author and historian
 Tom Reynolds, Republican politician
 George Schuster, driver in the 1908 New York to Paris Auto Race
 Allen D. Scott, former New York state senator
 Bill Simon, songwriter (with Jack Yellen), jazz critic, saxophonist
 Joey Snyder III, pro golfer
 Bill Warner, college football coach, brother of Pop Warner
 Glenn "Pop" Warner, coach, prompter, helped shape football into the form it is played today
 Christine Weidinger, opera singer
 Jack Yellen, songwriter (including "Ain't She Sweet" and the Franklin D. Roosevelt campaign tune "Happy Days Are Here Again")

Notable businesses and attractions

Springville Center for the Arts - A community multi-arts center that produces theater shows, gallery exhibits, workshops and more. The original establishment closed in 2007. Their new establishment is the former Baptist Church of Springville building on the corner of the four way stop of North Buffalo Street and Franklin Street.

Schools
Springville-Griffith Institute Central School District
St. Aloysius Regional School

References

External links
 Village of Springville official website
  Springville Chamber of Commerce
  History of Springville

Villages in New York (state)
Buffalo–Niagara Falls metropolitan area
Villages in Erie County, New York